Nikiforovskaya is a rural locality (a village) and the administrative center of Spasskoye Rural Settlement, Tarnogsky District, Vologda Oblast, Russia. The population was 150 as of 2002.

Geography 
Nikiforovskaya is located 31 km northwest of Tarnogsky Gorodok (the district's administrative centre) by road. Bashevskaya is the nearest rural locality.

References 

Rural localities in Tarnogsky District